Hasel is a river of Hesse, Germany.

The Hasel springs near Haselstein, a district of Nüsttal. It is a right tributary of the Haune near Hünfeld.

See also
List of rivers of Hesse

References

Rivers of Hesse
Rivers of Germany